Máire Hendron  is an Alliance Party politician who was a Member of the Northern Ireland Assembly (MLA) for Belfast East from  2019 to 2020. Hendron was co-opted the assembly in July 2019 after the incumbent MLA, Naomi Long, was elected to the European Parliament . She resigned as an MLA in January 2020.

She formerly sat as a Councillor on Belfast City Council and held the position of Deputy Lord Mayor of Belfast.

References

Alliance Party of Northern Ireland MLAs
Living people
Northern Ireland MLAs 2017–2022
Year of birth missing (living people)